Basil Montague Dale (1903–1976) was the Anglican Bishop of Jamaica from 1950  until 1955. He was educated at Dean Close School and Queens' College, Cambridge and ordained in 1927. His first post was as Curate of St Andrew's, Catford after which he was priest in charge of All Saints, Putney. Later he held incumbencies at Handsworth and Paignton. An Honorary Chaplain to the King he was Rural Dean of Hertford before appointment to the episcopate. On return from Jamaica he was Rector of Haslemere (1955–1962) and an Assistant Bishop of Guildford (1955–1967); in 1962, he resigned the Rectory and became Assistant Bishop full-time; he resigned his remaining role on 30 June 1967, in ill-health. He was a Doctor of Divinity.

References

1903 births
People educated at Dean Close School
Alumni of Queens' College, Cambridge
20th-century Anglican bishops in the Caribbean
Anglican bishops of Jamaica
1976 deaths
Honorary Chaplains to the King
Assistant bishops of Guildford